Ayeyawady-Chao Phraya-Mekong Economic Cooperation Strategy (ACMECS) is a political, economic, and cultural organization among Thailand, Laos, Vietnam, Cambodia and Myanmar.
At the special ASEAN Summit on SARS, held in Bangkok on 29 April 2003, Prime Minister Thaksin Shinawatra raised the idea of establishing what was then called the “Economic Cooperation Strategy", with leaders of Cambodia, Lao PDR and Myanmar.

The objectives of this new initiative are to bridge the economic gap among these five countries and to promote prosperity in the sub-region in a sustainable manner. Such prosperity, it is expected, will not only benefit the four countries, but also add value to ASEAN and its solidarity. It is hoped that a stronger Cambodia, Lao PDR, Myanmar and Thailand will also mean a stronger ASEAN. In this way the new cooperation framework is expected to act as a building block and move ASEAN forward at a more even pace, on the basis of self-reliance and shared prosperity.

Leaders of Cambodia, Lao PDR, Myanmar and Thailand met for the first time on 12 November 2003 in Bagan, the Union of Myanmar. At the Summit, the four Leaders adopted the Bagan Declaration, affirming their commitment to cooperate in five priority areas of cooperation, and endorsed the Economic Cooperation Strategy Plan of Action, under which 46 common projects and 224 bilateral projects were listed for implementation over the next ten years. The Leaders agreed to call this newly created economic cooperation framework the "Ayeyawady-Chao Phraya-Mekong Economic Cooperation Strategy" or "ACMECS".

The joining of Vietnam with the group on 10 May 2004 has increased ACMECS to 5 member countries. The emphasis of ACMECS is on using self-help and partnership to achieve sustainable development, including poverty reduction, in line with the UN Millennium Development Goals.

ACMECS is intended to act as a catalyst to build upon existing regional cooperation programs and complement bilateral frameworks with a view to transforming the border areas of the five countries into zones of economic growth, social progress and prosperity, and to blending local, national and regional interests for common benefits, shared prosperity, enhanced solidarity, peace, stability and good neighborliness.

External links
acmecs official website
acmecsthailand Official ACMECS Business Council Website

Organizations established in 2003
International political organizations
International economic organizations
International organizations based in Asia